Elections to the Assam Legislative Assembly were held in 2001 to elect members of 114 constituencies in Assam, India. The Indian National Congress won the popular vote and a majority of seats and Tarun Gogoi was appointed as the Chief Minister of Assam. The number of constituencies was set as 126, by the recommendation of the Delimitation Commission of India.

After the elections, the sitting MP for Kaliabor. Tarun Gogoi became the chief minister. His brother, Dip Gogoi, the winner from the Titabar constituency, resigned from his seat so that Tarun could win the seat in a by-election. Dip later fought and won the by-election for the, now vacant, Kaliabor Lok Sabha seat.

Result

Elected members

See also
List of constituencies of the Assam Legislative Assembly
2001 elections in India

References

Assam
State Assembly elections in Assam
2000s in Assam